Billboard year-end top 50 R&B singles of 1965 is the year-end chart compiled by Billboard magazine ranking the top rhythm and blues singles of 1965. The list was based on charts from the January 30 through October 30. 

The year's No. 1 R&B hit was "I Can't Help Myself (Sugar Pie Honey Bunch)" by the Four Tops which held the No. 1 spot for nine consecutive weeks from June 5 to July 31.

Because the list ends with the October 30 chart, it omits hit songs that peaked after October 30, including (i) Fontella Bass' "Rescue Me" which held the No. 1 spot for four consecutive weeks from October 30 to November 20, and (ii) James Brown's "I Got You (I Feel Good)" which held the No. 1 spot for four consecutive weeks from December 4 to December 25.

See also
List of Top Selling Rhythm & Blues Singles number ones of 1965
Billboard Year-End Hot 100 singles of 1965
1965 in music

References

1963 record charts
Billboard charts
1963 in American music